This is a list of the 22 members of the European Parliament for Sweden in the 1994 to 1999 session.

List

Sweden
List
1995